SP-353  is a state highway in the state of São Paulo in Brazil. The highway connects with SP-326 at Terra Roxa.

References

Highways in São Paulo (state)